Ralph Inman (1713–1788) was a merchant in 18th-century Boston, Massachusetts, with a residence in Cambridge. During the American Revolution he supported the British.

Portraits of Inman were made by Robert Feke and John Singleton Copley.

See also
 Inman Square

References

Further reading

 Rules of incorporation for the Society for Encouraging Industry and Employing the Poor. Boston: 1754.
 The constitution of a Christian church illustrated in a sermon at the opening of Christ-Church in Cambridge on Thursday 15 October, MDCCLXI. By East Apthorp, M.A. late Fellow of Jesus College in the University of Cambridge. 1761.
 A state of the importations from Great-Britain into the port of Boston, from the beginning of Jan. 1769, to Aug. 17th 1769. With the advertisements of a set of men who assumed to themselves the title of "All the well disposed merchants," who entered into a solemn agreement, (as they called it) not to import goods from Britain, and who undertook to give a "true account" of what should be imported by other persons. The whole taken from the Boston chronicle, in which the following papers were first published. Boston: 1769.
 An Address of the gentlemen and principal inhabitants of the town of Boston, to His Excellency Governor Gage. Boston: 1775.

Image gallery

1713 births
1788 deaths
People from Boston
18th century in Boston
American Loyalists from Massachusetts
Inman Square